The MV Horizon-1 was a dry bulk cargo ship owned and operated by the Istanbul based Turkish company Horizon Denizcilik İç ve Dış Ticaret A.Ş. (Horizon Maritime Trading Co.).

On July 8, 2009, the ship was captured by Somali pirates in the Gulf of Aden. At the time of the seizure, the Horizon-1s crew  consisted of 23 Turks including a female third officer. The vessel had experienced a hijacking attempt on March 19 the same year in that area.

Hijacking 
On March 19, 2009, the Horizon-1 was harassed on its way from Ukraine to China in the Gulf of Aden by Somali pirates as she witnessed the hijacking of the Greek-owned vessel MV Titan. The captain alerted naval forces, which were patrolling in the area. The attack on Horizon-1 was prevented by the appearance of the naval forces.

In the morning of July 10, 2009 at 08:29 EEST (05:29 UTC), the Horizon-1 was attacked again in the Gulf of Aden and hijacked by five armed pirates. She was carrying 33,000 tons of dry sulfur from Saudi Arabia to Jordan. As reported by the Turkish Navy, the vessel was brought first to the Somali port of Hordio, where she moored on July 9 at around 09:00 EEST (6:00 UTC). Turkish frigates TCG Gaziantep and TCG Gediz stood by in the vicinity. On July 10, the Horizon-1 left Hordio and sailed to the so-called pirate haven of Eyl in  distance southwards, cruising at low speed for unknown reason.

At the time of the incident, the vessel's crew consisted of 23 Turks including the 24-year-old, female third officer Aysun Akbay, a graduate of Black Sea Technical University's Department of Deck at Sürmene Faculty of Marine Sciences. Contacted by phone, she reported that "all the crew members are alive and unharmed, resting in their cabins and their food is not confiscated".

While the ship's owner gave permission to the Turkish Navy for freeing the vessel and her crew by forced intervention, the Turkish government rejected this option due to lack of procedures in case of getting hold of the pirates. The Turkish officials rather preferred to contact Kenyan authorities for legal assistance, who have more experience in handling pirates from Somalia.

Release
The vessel was released with its crew on October 5, 2009 at 17:30 local time against a ransom of US$2,750,000 paid by a British mediator.

Ship's register 

 Bergo since June 12, 1990 
 Dyvi Atlantic since May 19, 1998
 Norhaven since December 19, 2001
 Fauna F. since January 18, 2003
 Athina since October 2, 2007

References 

Bulk carriers
Maritime incidents in 2009
Ships attacked and captured by pirates
Cargo ships of Turkey
Ships built in Gdynia
Piracy in Somalia
1979 ships